The 1974 WTA Tour was composed of the fourth annual Virginia Slims Circuit and Women's International Grand Prix, a tour of tennis tournaments for female tennis players, sponsored by Virginia Slims cigarettes. The WTA signed their first television broadcast contract in 1974, with the broadcasting network CBS with Brent Musburger announcing.

Schedule
This is a calendar of all events sponsored by Virginia Slims in the year 1974, with player progression documented from the quarterfinals stage. The table also includes the Grand Slam tournaments, the 1974 Virginia Slims Championships and the 1974 Federation Cup.

Key

December (1973)

January

February

March

April

May

June

July

August

September

October

November

December

Earnings

Statistical information
These tables present the number of singles (S), doubles (D), and mixed doubles (X) titles won by each player and each nation during the 1973 Virginia Slims Circuit. They also include data for the Grand Slam tournaments and the year-end championships. The table is sorted by:

 total number of titles (a doubles title won by two players representing the same nation counts as only one win for the nation);
 highest amount of highest category tournaments (for example, having a single Grand Slam gives preference over any kind of combination without a Grand Slam title);
 a singles > doubles > mixed doubles hierarchy;
 alphabetical order (by family names for players).

Key

Titles won by player

Titles won by nation

See also
 1974 World Team Tennis season
 1974 Men's Grand Prix circuit

References

External links
Women's Tennis Association (WTA) official website
International Tennis Federation (ITF) official website

 
Virginia Slims WTA Tour
WTA Tour seasons